The Richmond Highway Express a.k.a. "REX", is a limited-stop bus route operated by the Washington Metropolitan Area Transit Authority between King Street–Old Town station of the Yellow and Blue lines of the Washington Metro and Fort Belvoir. This line runs through the Richmond Highway (U.S. Route 1) corridor in Fairfax County, Virginia. This line provides a cross-county service from the neighborhood of Old Town Alexandria in Alexandria, Virginia and the military base of Fort Belvoir in Fairfax County.

Route

REX runs from its northern end at King Street–Old Town station, south through Eisenhower Avenue station, Huntington station and Mount Vernon, Virginia before ending at Fort Belvoir Post Exchange and Commissary. The service runs limited stops along Richmond Highway in Alexandria between Huntington Station and Fort Belvoir. Local stops are provided by Fairfax Connector routes 151, 161, 162, 171, and 308. The REX also provides service through Groveton, Virginia, and Hybla Valley, Virginia throughout the route.

Stops

REX bus stops are provided on the special blue-and-gold sign, instead of the traditional red Metrobus stop signs. The route does not join the Metrobus stop signs when it connects to other Metrobus routes.

Service

REX operates seven days a week with frequent service during peak hours. Off peak hours service runs every 30 minutes, and Sunday service runs every 60 minutes. During holidays, a Saturday Supplemental schedule is added to bring more service to the REX. All runs take place on board on any bus from Cinder Bed Division. However, it was previously operated by using the 2008 New Flyer DE40LFA diesel-electric hybrid buses (6301–6312), and were painted in a blue-and-gold REX paint scheme. The original REX bus fleet consisted of 12 now-retired 2000 Orion VI buses (2073–2084). The 2000 Orion VI buses were wrapped in the REX scheme, instead of being painted. The second REX fleet consisted of 12 now-retired 2006 Orion VII CNG buses (2674–2685). The Orion VII CNGs were the first set which is painted in the REX scheme, until they were all repainted between June and August 2014. The third REX fleet consisted of 12 2010 New Flyer DE40LFA diesel-electric hybrid buses (6550–6561) before being repainted back into the red local scheme. The REX has previously operated out of Four Mile Run division (2004-2014) and Shepherd Parkway divisions (2014-2018).  From December 26, 2021 onward, the REX route is now operated entirely with regular Metrobuses.

History

REX began service on September 26, 2004. The REX takes over the southern portion of the 9A, which ran between Pentagon Station and Lorton VRE Station. The remaining portion of the 9A is provided by Fairfax Connector route 171, as the REX ends at Fort Belvoir. The fare of the initial REX route was $1.00, for a one-year demonstration period. The REX runs via the Jackson Loop at Fort Belvoir, although some trips alters via Pohick Road, when the Jackson Loop is closed. When the REX reaches Fort Belvoir, all customers that are on the REX follows the security procedure of Fort Belvoir, as the terminal is a military base. These procedures runs throughout all bus routes that serves Fort Belvoir. In 2008, the alternate terminal of the REX night trips was moved to Woodlawn at Old Mill Road. The night REX trips does not serve Fort Belvoir. In addition to these changes, the REX route adds a Saturday Supplemental trip, where it adds more trips on holiday, when REX runs on a Saturday schedule. The Saturday Supplemental trips operates up to Woodlawn, the same place where the night REX trips ends. Alongside with these changes, the special $1.00 fare was changed to the same fare as any regular Metrobus routes in January, 2009. In 2011, Fort Belvoir open doors to all REX trips, following the opening of Fort Belvoir Community Hospital. REX retained the full route until 2017, when the route was extended to the Fort Belvoir Post Exchange/Commissary. This extension is only effective during weekdays, as the REX does not operate at the Post Exchange/Commissary on the weekends.

Service changes

The REX does not change its main route since its opening, although times and stops were changed throughout time. Since the first time changes in the mid-2000s, REX adds more trips when there is a high demand in the route.

August 2011 changes

On August 7, 2011, the Fort Belvoir Community Hospital opened, opening the gates for 24 hours. The Fort Belvoir gates hour changes leads the night REX trips to discontinue the alternate routing service, which ends at Woodlawn. Service towards the Dewitt Hospital at Fort Belvoir was discontinued.

June 2017 changes

On June 25, 2017, the REX weekday service was extended to the Fort Belvoir Post Exchange/Commissary via Gunston Road. REX service to Jackson Loop was discontinued. Nearby stops will be served along Gunston Road at 5th Street.

Future

In 2015, Fairfax County and WMATA plans to expand service through Richmond Highway. The major plans is to convert the REX route into a Bus rapid transit route, which the project is known as "Embark Richmond Highway." This project is to bring more service along Richmond Highway by extending service from Fort Belvoir up to Woodbridge. The idea of this project will add new stations, by widening Richmond Highway in order to make the dedicated stops for the new BRT route and the REX.

References 

2004 establishments in Virginia
Transport infrastructure completed in 2004
REX